Australian architectural styles, like the revivalist trends which dominated Europe for centuries, have been primarily derivative.

Background 
Europeans’ early contacts with Indigenous populations led them to misinterpret Aboriginal and Torres Strait Islander peoples' ways of life. Until the 20th century, a fallacy existed that Aboriginal and Torres Strait Islander peoples lacked permanent buildings and their own forms of architecture. Labelling Aboriginal communities as 'nomadic' allowed early settlers to justify the takeover of traditional lands claiming that they were not inhabited by permanent residents. A large body of evidence now indicates that a broad range of Indigenous traditional architecture forms (known as ethoarchitecture) and sophisticated knowledge of construction existed.

During the nineteenth century, Australian architects were inspired by developments in England. This is in part due to a large number of architects coming from England to Australia to practice. In the twentieth century, American and International influences dominated. As Australia gradually became a multicultural nation in the late 20th century, the influences of immigrants also became evident. Imported exotic styles earlier than this can be found in a small number of historically significant Joss houses and synagogues. In more recent times, other global and South-East Asian influences have had a minor influence on Australian architectural styles.

Some architectural styles show the direct influence of local factors such as climate (directly resulting in the "Filigree", "Queenslander" and "Federation Home" styles) and local materials and skillsets. Some Australian architects were also seen at the forefront of various movements, particularly residential architects like Harry Norris, Roy Grounds, Robin Boyd, Frederick Romberg and Harry Seidler.

Categories of styles

Australian Architectural Styles can be divided into two main categories: "Residential" and "Non-Residential". Residential styles are the most widespread and account for the majority of the buildings constructed in Australia, but non-residential buildings display the greater variety of styles.

Styles in detail:

Australian residential architectural styles 30,000 BCE – present
Australian non-residential architectural styles 1788–present

See also 
 Architecture of Australia
 List of architectural styles

References 

 
 Ulrike Laule, Rolf Toman, Achim Bednorz - Architecture of the Middle Ages - Background to the Gothic Revival style.
 George Wilkie - Building Your Own Home - Section on Architectural Styles
 Styles
 Canberra House
 Style resources

External links 
 Australian architectural heritage – satire Interpreting paradise

Architectural styles
Architecture in Australia
Indigenous architecture